Danny Andersen (born 29 January 1983) is a Danish professional footballer, who is currently playing for FA 2000.

Club career
In recent years he has been a highly goal-oriented player and has guaranteed many scores. In Helsingør IF, he scored 21 goals  in the 2003/2004 season, which included a title as the player of the year. For the next 3 years, Danny Andersen played for HIK, who often lay in battle for survival, but it did not prevent him from making goals. His last season for HIK resulted in 15 goals and with a high position on the top scorer list in the Danish 1st Division. 

Danny Andersen chose in the summer of 2008 to change Lyngby Boldklub out with BK Frem, who was looking for a striker. Danny left the club in 2010, but returned the summer of 2015

He was almost injured all year 2016 and only got a few matches on the 2nd team. Andersen left the club in the winter 2017. He started up at amateur-side FA 2000 in the Denmark Series with his old coach in Fremad Amager, Tim Ilsø.

Playing style
In addition to being goal-oriented, he is a very hard-working and diligent attacker who is good at stressing opponents. At the same time he is very moving and, in terms of his speed and commitment, creates many chances for himself and the team. He has a good and resolute kick and is good at looking for the free areas on the pitch between the opposing midfield and defense. As an attacker, his running crew is sublime and it enables him to constantly seek out the quarters, half and all the chances of great value for himself and not least the team.

Personal life
His brother Ronnie Andersen had also played in Elite 3000.←

References

External links
Danny Andersen at BK FREM

1983 births
Living people
Danish men's footballers
Danish 1st Division players
Lyngby Boldklub players
Boldklubben Frem players
Danish Superliga players
Fremad Amager players
BK Søllerød-Vedbæk players

Association football forwards
FA 2000 players